Beat Records was an independent record label started by California night club promoter Stephen Zepeda (a.k.a. Steve Zepeda). Beat Records had record releases by Gary Valentine (of Blondie), The Furys, and The Plimsouls (featuring Peter Case). It spanned the 1978 to 1980 time period of Los Angeles rock.

Zepeda is best known for booking Bogart's night club in Long Beach, California, which was a very popular hub for alternative music in the late 1980s and early 1990s.

Releases by Beat Records
"The First One"/"Tomorrow Belongs To You", Gary Valentine (1978) – 45 rpm
"Moving Target"/"We Talk We Dance", The Furys (1979) – 45 rpm
Zero Hour E.P., The Plimsouls (1980) - "Great Big World" / "Zero Hour" / "Hypnotized" / "How Long Will It Take?" / "I Can't Turn You Loose, 12 inch E.P.

See also
 List of record labels

References

  Valentine, Gary, New York Rocker: My Life in the Blank Generation with Blondie, Iggy Pop, and others, page 192, Oct. 18, 2006
  Snowden, Don/ Leonard, Gary, Make the music go bang!: the early L.A. punk scene, page 37, Nov. 15, 1997

American independent record labels
Alternative rock record labels
Rock record labels
Music of Los Angeles
Record labels based in California
Defunct record labels of the United States
Record labels established in 1978
Record labels disestablished in 1980
1978 establishments in California
1980 disestablishments in California
Defunct companies based in Greater Los Angeles